Notable schools in the state of Odisha, India, include

 Aditya Birla Public School, Rayagada
 Badagada Government High School, Bhubaneswar
 Balangir Public School, Balangir
 Capital High School, Bhubaneswar
 Carmel School, Rourkela
 D.A.V. Public School, Chandrasekharpur, Bhubaneswar
 Dabugaon Girls High School, Nabarangpur
 DAV Public School, Unit-8, Bhubaneswar
 Deepika English Medium School, Rourkela
 Delhi Public School, Rourkela
 Demonstration Multipurpose School, Bhubaneswar
 Doon International School (Bhubaneswar)
 G.C.D. High School, Rayagada
 Government High School, Saheed Nagar
 Government High School, Uditnagar, Rourkela
 Govt. B.N. High School, Padmapur
 Govt. Girls' High School, Rayagada
 Indo English School, Rourkela
 Ispat English Medium School, Rourkela
 Jawahar Navodaya Vidyalaya, Bagudi
 Jawahar Navodaya Vidyalaya, Mundali
 Jawahar Navodaya Vidyalaya, Narla
 Jobra High School, Cuttack
 Kendriya Vidyalaya No. 1, Bhubaneswar
 Kendriya Vidyalaya Rourkela
 Kendriya Vidyalaya, Charbatia, Cuttack
 Kendriya Vidyalaya, Sundargarh
 Khariar Public School, Khariar
 KIIT International School, Bhubaneswar
 Loyola School, Baripada
 Loyola School, Bhubaneswar
 M.N High School, Pattamundai
 Maharaja High School, Sonepur
 MahaRaja's Boys' High School, Paralakhemundi
 Modern English School, Jeypore
 Odisha Adarsha Vidyalaya, Jeypore
 Pragati Vidya Mandir
 Puri Zilla School, Puri
 Raja Basudev High School, Debagarh
 Ravenshaw Collegiate School, Cuttack
 SAI International Residential School Bhubaneswar
 Sainik School, Bhubaneswar
 Sandeepani Vidyapeeth, Balasore
 SDMT Prabhavati Public School, Titlagarh
 Secondary Board High School, Cuttack
 Sri Aurobindo School, Sambalpur
 St Joseph's Convent School, Rourkela
 St Paul's School, Rourkela
 St. Joseph's Convent Higher Secondary School, Sambalpur
 St. Joseph's School, Kendrapara
 St. Mary's Higher Secondary School, Jharsuguda
 Stewart School, Cuttack
 Subalaya High School, Subalaya
 The DN Wisdom Tree Global School
 Vignan Institute of Technology and Management
 Vignan Vidyalaya, Rayagada

Schools in Odisha
schools in Odisha
Odisha